Xavier University is a private Jesuit university in Cincinnati, Ohio. It is the sixth-oldest Catholic and fourth-oldest Jesuit university in the United States. Xavier has an undergraduate enrollment of 4,860 students and graduate enrollment of 1,269 students. The school's system comprises the main campus in Cincinnati, Ohio, as well as regional locations for the Accelerated Bachelor of Science in Nursing (ABSN) program in Columbus and Cleveland.

Xavier University is primarily an undergraduate, liberal arts institution. It provides an education in the Jesuit tradition, which emphasizes learning through community service, interdisciplinary courses and the engagement of faith, theology, philosophy and ethics studies.

Xavier's athletic teams, known as the Xavier Musketeers, compete in the National Collegiate Athletic Association (NCAA) Division I level in the Big East Conference.

History

Xavier University is the fourth oldest Jesuit University and the sixth oldest Catholic university in the United States. The school was founded in 1831 as a men's college in downtown Cincinnati next to St. Francis Xavier Church on Sycamore Street. The Athenaeum, as it was then called, was dedicated to the patronage of Saint Francis Xavier by Bishop Edward Fenwick on October 17, 1831. Upon Bishop John Baptist Purcell's request, the Society of Jesus took control of The Athenaeum in 1840, and the name was changed to St. Xavier College in honor of the 16th century Spanish Jesuit missionary, St. Francis Xavier who, like the founder of the Jesuits, Ignatius Loyola, was a Spanish Navarrese.

The "original" Anthenaeum is now the seminary of the Archdiocese of Cincinnati. St. Xavier College and St. Xavier High School officially split in 1919, though they did not become financially independent until 1934. The school's name was changed a second time to its current name, Xavier University, in 1930.

Xavier fully admitted women starting in 1969, but women began attending the college in 1914 in the evening, weekend, and summer school divisions. Edgecliff College, another Catholic college in Cincinnati, merged with Xavier University in 1980.

Academics

Majors and minors 
Xavier University has more than 90 undergraduate majors and 40 graduate programs within the College of Arts and Sciences, The College of Professional Sciences, The College of Nursing and the Williams College of Business. Majors include nursing, business, biomedical sciences, psychology, biology, exploratory, exercise science, sport management, sport marketing and finance. All students must complete the core curriculum (see below).

Rankings 
 Xavier was ranked No. 166 among national universities by U.S. News & World Report for its 2022-23 edition of America's Best Colleges report.
 Forbes ranked Xavier #492 among its 'Top Colleges in America' for 2022
 Princeton Review ranked Xavier among its 'Best 378 Colleges in America' for 2022
 Niche ranked Xavier the #6 Catholic College in Ohio for 2023
 U.S. News & World Report ranked Xavier #23 in 'Best Undergraduate Business Analytics Programs in the Nation' for 2022-23
 U.S. News & World Report ranked Xavier #25 in 'Best Undergraduate Entrepreneurship Program in the Nation' for 2022-23
 U.S. News & World Report ranked Xavier #29 in 'Best Undergraduate Marketing Programs in the Nation' for 2022-23
 U.S. News & World Report ranked Xavier #36 in 'Best Undergraduate Finance Programs in the Nation' for 2022-23
 U.S. News & World Report ranked Xavier #54 in 'Best Undergraduate Teaching Program Among National Universities' for 2022-23

Core curriculum
Undergraduate students attending Xavier must complete a significant number of distribution requirements that are more commonly known as the Core Curriculum. There are required courses in: Theology, Philosophy, Mathematics, Fine Arts, History, Physical Science, Literature, Second Language, and the Social Sciences.

Honorary society chapters 
Xavier has several honorary society chapters, including:
 Alpha Sigma Nu, the honor society of Jesuit institutions of higher education
 Beta Alpha Psi, an honor organization for financial information students and professionals
 Beta Gamma Sigma, the international honor society serving business programs accredited by AACSB International
 Phi Beta Kappa, an elite honor society present within only 10% of universities
 Mortar Board, national honor society recognizing college seniors
 Eta Sigma Phi, an honor society aimed at preserving interest and scholarship in Classical Studies.

Campus

At the center of campus are the Gallagher Student Center and Bellarmine Chapel. Bellarmine Chapel's roof is in the shape of a hyperbolic paraboloid, also known as a saddle roof, that will not collapse even if the Chapel walls were removed. The chapel is also home to an active parish community independent of the university.

Academic mall
Six buildings with castle architecture overlook Victory parkway on one side of the Academic Mall: Lindner Hall (home to the Department of Physics), Logan Hall (home to the Chemistry Department), Albers Hall (home to the Biology Department), Hinkle Hall (home to the Departments of Mathematics, Computer Science, English, History, Philosophy and Theology), Schmidt Hall (houses the University Administration offices)  and Edgecliff Hall (home to the Department of Music).

The other side of the Academic mall includes three buildings: Walter Schott Hall (home to the Office of Admission, Office of Financial Aid and the Departments of Modern Languages, Classics, Communication Arts, Political Science and Sociology), McDonald Library (home to the University Library and Archives) and Alter Hall (main classroom building on campus).

Our Lady of Peace Chapel was relocated to the Academic Mall in 2018. Originally constructed in 1938 by Charles F. and Elizabeth R. Williams on their property in Anderson Township, the 22-seat chapel is now located off Dana Avenue on the west end of the Academic Mall.

Academic Quad
The Academic Quad, also known as the Hoff Quad, is east of the Academic Mall. It includes three buildings: Conaton Learning Commons (home to academic support services), Smith Hall (home to the Williams College of Business) and Hailstones Hall (traditional classroom building).

Residential Mall

The Residential Mall, north of the Academic mall, includes four underclassmen residence halls: Brockman Hall, Buenger Hall, Kuhlman Hall and Husman Hall. The all-purpose area for students and events between Kuhlman, Husman and Gallagher is referred to as "The Xavier Yard."

A residential complex called Justice Hall (formerly known as Fenwick Place) opened in fall 2011 to the south of the Residential Mall. It is home to the campus dining center in addition to providing housing for upper-class students.

West Campus
West campus is on the west side of Victory Parkway. Athletic facilities include J. Page Hayden Field, Corcoran Soccer Field, Schmidt Fieldhouse and the Heidt Champion Center (formerly O'Connor Recreational Center).

Academic buildings include: St. Barbara Hall and the Armory (home to Xavier's ROTC program), Joseph Hall (Home to the Education and Sports Studies Departments) and Elet Hall (home to the Department of Psychology).

East Campus
The Cintas Center, where the Musketeers host their basketball games, is adjacent to the Residential Mall. In addition to the 10,250-seat arena, Cintas also includes the Schiff Conference Center and the James and Caroline Duff Banquet Center. The A. B. Cohen Center, located across the parking lot from Cintas Center, is home to the Art Department and Xavier Art Gallery.

The Health United Building opened in 2019. Located between University Station and the Commons Apartments, the facility houses a recreational center, an upgraded health and wellness center, and classroom facilities and labs for five academic programs: Nursing, Occupational Therapy, Health Services Administration, Sport Studies and Radiologic Technology.

Athletics

Xavier competes at the NCAA Division I level in the Big East Conference, and their mascot is D'Artagnan the Musketeer. Xavier sponsors eight intercollegiate sports for men, and eight sports for women. The university's graduation rate of 94% is the third highest graduation rate for athletes in the nation behind Duke University and Stanford University. Xavier sports teams have several traditional rivalries with local universities, including the University of Cincinnati and the Villanova University.

Xavier was a founding member of the Midwestern City Conference in 1979. Renamed the Midwestern Collegiate Conference in 1985, it is now known as the Horizon League. Xavier was a member of the Atlantic 10 Conference from 1995 to 2013 where it enjoyed many successful basketball seasons. On March 20, 2013, the Xavier administration announced that the school will join the newly created Big East following the realignment of the old Big East Conference, and moved to the new conference July 1, 2013.

The basketball and volleyball teams play in the 10,250-seat Cintas Center on campus which opened in 2000.

Men's basketball

The Xavier men's basketball team is perhaps the best known of the sports sponsored at Xavier. The team has enjoyed considerable recent success, reaching the Elite Eight in the NCAA Tournament in 2004, 2008, and 2017. Since 1985, every men's basketball player who has played as a senior has graduated with a degree.  During the era of college football's now-defunct Bowl Championship Series, Xavier was one of only two schools outside the main BCS conferences (a group now known as the Power Five) to be listed among the top 20 most valuable programs in college basketball (the other being UNLV) according to Forbes.

Football

Xavier fielded an NCAA Division I football team until the 1973 season.

Baseball

The Xavier baseball team won the 2014 Big East Championship and participated in the Nashville Regional. The 2009 Xavier Baseball team won the Atlantic 10 tournament and participated in the Houston Regional.

Swimming
The Xavier men's swim team earned the school's first Big East Conference Championship in 2014. The Xavier men's swim team overall has captured the Big East Title in 2014, 2015, 2016, 2019, 2020, and 2021 making it their second three peat and sixth championship in their eight years since joining the conference in 2013.

Club sports
The club sports program is designed to serve the interests of Xavier University students, faculty, and staff in different sports and recreational activities. These interests may be competitive, recreational, and/or instructional in nature.

The Xavier Men's Volleyball Club Team took home 2nd place at Nationals in April 2019. No other team in the history of Xavier Sports has made it that far in a national tournament. Until 2022, when the Xavier Men's Volleyball Club Team won the national championship.

Mascots
Xavier is one of a handful of universities with two mascots. D'Artagnan, the Musketeer, is the university's official mascot and is the origin of the school's nickname, The Xavier Musketeers. The Musketeer concept was suggested in 1925 by the late Reverend Francis J. Finn, S.J.

The Blue Blob came about in 1985 when the spirit squad coordinators realized that a more audience-friendly mascot was needed. The musketeer mascot, who sported a handlebar mustache and a prop sword, scared younger spectators. The Blue Blob is a furry creature that has made several television and magazine appearances over the years, including a controversial PlayBoy appearance. The Blue Blob has Bobble-Body dolls, Plush replicas, and T-shirts made in his likeness, and an annual Blue Blob Appreciation Night during the Musketeer's basketball season. He most recently appeared on two ESPN This is SportsCenter commercials with Pro Football Hall of Fame member Jim Kelly and SportsCenter anchors Scott Van Pelt and John Anderson.

Media
Most Xavier games can be heard on WLW or WKRC-AM. Joe Sunderman does the play-by-play and Byron Larkin does color commentary for most games. Fox Sports Net Ohio holds the local television rights to the Musketeers basketball games. Brad Johansen does play-by-play and Steve Wolf is the analyst. Over the air stations, WCPO-TV and WSTR-TV have held the rights to Xavier games in the past.

Faith and service
The Dorothy Day Center for Faith and Justice is an important part of Xavier University's mission to form men and women for others.

Student programs
At the beginning of freshman year, the center gives students opportunities to form community among themselves, with an effort at inclusiveness across all lines of faith and culture. They are then encouraged to join the other students in choosing from a variety of service opportunities.

Students can pursue community service through the following programs: work in the Nexus community garden, weekly service with organizations in the Cincinnati area through the X-CHANGE program, Community Action Day when the whole XU community and alumni are encouraged to give a day of service to the larger community, a monthly service opportunity at St. Francis Seraph Soup Kitchen, and Alternative Breaks offering opportunities to serve in the United States and abroad during fall and spring breaks. A total of 25 immersion trips are offered. It is estimated that students perform more than 60,000 service hours in a year.

Most programs include reflection components and the following programs facilitated by the center are also staged to provoke reflection: Ignatian Family Teach-In for Justice, Stories of Solidarity, Jesuit Martyrs of El Salvador commemoration, and Contemplatives in Action.

More intensive service experiences include the following:
Summer Service Internship allows 20 students to live on campus while being paid for working at an area non-profit.
Graduate Internship employs graduates to work along with the CFJ staff.
 is the center's listing of non-profit internships nationwide. This is supplemented by Idealist.org which includes also international listings. Sponsors of internships include Scripps Howard Foundation, the Catholic Archdiocese, the Catholic Campaign for Human Development, and Community Shares.
GetAway for First Year Students, with opportunities to organize and make spiritual retreats.
Graduate School and Year-of-Service Fair introduces students to over 50 options for a year of service after graduation, at home and abroad. Some of the more popular are Peace Corps, Jesuit Volunteer Corps, Public Allies, and Americorps. Long listings of possibilities are on websites hosted by Stanford, Notre Dame, Service Leader, and Volunteer.gov.

Notable alumni

 Danny Abramowicz (born 1945), NFL wide receiver
 George Billman, physiology professor at Ohio State
 J. Kenneth Blackwell, Ohio Secretary of State, 2006 Republican Ohio gubernatorial candidate
 John Boehner, Speaker of the U.S. House of Representatives for the 112th Congress and 113th Congress, U.S. House of Representatives Minority Leader and Majority Leader
 Phil H. Bucklew, Naval Officer and professional football player. Widely credited as the "Father of Naval Special Warfare"
 Jim Bunning, U.S. Senator from Kentucky, member of Baseball Hall of Fame. Threw baseball's seventh perfect game as a member of the Philadelphia Phillies in 1964
 Derrick Brown, small forward for the New York Knicks
 John A. Cade, Maryland State Senator
 Lionel Chalmers, professional basketball player
 Donald D. Clancy, Congressman
 Bill Cunningham, radio talk show host for Cincinnati's 700 WLW
 Dane Dastillung, American football player
 John J. Dillon, 35th Indiana Attorney General
 Dennis E. Eckart, Congressman
 Russell Findlay, first chief marketing officer, Major League Soccer
 Thomas J. Fogarty, surgeon and inventor of the balloon embolectomy catheter
 Edward J. Gardner, Congressman
 GEN Michael X. Garrett, Commanding General, United States Army Forces Command
Kaiser Gates (born 1996), basketball player for Hapoel Jerusalem of the Israeli Basketball Premier League
 Charles Geschke, President and co-founder of Adobe Systems 
 Brian Grant, NBA forward Los Angeles Lakers
Nick Hagglund (born 1992), MLS player
 Richard Hague (born 1947), poet
 Victor W. Hall, U.S. Navy admiral
 Zach Hankins (born 1996), basketball player for Hapoel Jerusalem of the Israeli Basketball Premier League
 Michael Hawkins (born 1972), NBA player
Bob Heleringer (class of 1973), member of the Kentucky House of Representatives and Louisville lawyer
Howard V. Hendrix, science fiction author
 Patricia L. Herbold, U.S. Ambassador to Singapore
 Paul John Hilbert, member of the Texas House of Representatives
 Tyrone Hill, NBA All Star forward; played 14 seasons with 5 teams
 Jack Hoffman (1930-2001), NFL player
 Greg J. Holbrock, U.S. representative
 Tu Holloway (born 1989), basketball player for Maccabi Rishon LeZion in the Israeli Basketball Premier League.
 Robert Huebner (1914-1998), virologist
Tyrique Jones (born 1997), basketball player for Hapoel Tel Aviv in the Israeli Basketball Premier League
 Jason Kokrak, professional golfer
 Alfred James Lechner Jr., US federal judge
 John C. Lechleiter, President, CEO, and Chairman of Eli Lilly and Company
 John Logsdon, Director of the Space Policy Institute at George Washington University
 Ken Lucas, U.S. Representative from Kentucky
 Tom Luken, Ohio politician
Mark Lyons, basketball player, top scorer in the Israel Basketball Premier League in both 2015 and 2017
 Nora McInerny, writer
 Rhine McLin, Mayor of Dayton
 Art Mergenthal, American football player
 Jack Miles, Pulitzer Prize winner
 Ryan Nemeth, professional wrestler signed to WWE
 Donald C. Nugent, US federal judge
 David Nordyke, educator
 Daniel Edward Pilarczyk, archbishop
 James Posey, NBA assistant coach. Two-time NBA champion as a player with the Miami Heat and Boston Celtics.
 Jalen Reynolds (born 1992), basketball player for Maccabi Tel Aviv of the Israeli Basketball Premier League and Euroleague.
 Dennis L. Riley (born 1945), politician who served in the New Jersey General Assembly, represented the 4th Legislative District from 1980 to 1990.
 Richard Romanus, actor best known for recurring role in The Sopranos
 Robert Romanus, actor best known for role in Fast Times at Ridgemont High
Romain Sato, Central African basketball player
Chris Seelbach, Cincinnati City Council member
 Dom Sigillo, American football player
 Julianne Smith, U.S. Ambassador to NATO
 Matt Stainbrook, basketball player in the German Bundesliga
 Derek Strong (born 1968), NBA player
 Francis Wade, philosopher
 David West, power forward for the Golden State Warriors. 2003 USBWA National Player of the Year and two-time NBA All-Star
 Carroll Williams, player of gridiron football
 Garry Wills, Pulitzer Prize-winning author
 Leo Wise (1849–1933), newspaper editor and publisher

Notable faculty
 Arthur J. Dewey, New Testament scholar
 John J. Gilligan, Congressman and Governor of Ohio
 Paul F. Knitter, theologian
 Richard Polt, Heidegger scholar; manual typewriter enthusiast
 Henry Heimlich, "inventor" of Heimlich Maneuver, Advanced Clinical Science Professor 1977–89
 Boris Podolsky, physicist and "creator" of the EPR paradox
 Norman Finkelstein, poet and literary critic

See also
 List of Jesuit sites
 Xavier Newswire

Notes

References

Further reading

External links
 
 Xavier Athletics website

 
Educational institutions established in 1831
Jesuit universities and colleges in the United States
Association of Catholic Colleges and Universities
Greater Cincinnati Consortium of Colleges and Universities
Universities and colleges in Cincinnati
Catholic universities and colleges in Ohio
Roman Catholic Archdiocese of Cincinnati
1831 establishments in Ohio